is a former Japanese football player and manager.

Playing career
Higashikawa was born in Ishikawa Prefecture on September 30, 1964. After graduating from Kokushikan University, he joined Yamaha Motors (later Júbilo Iwata) in 1988. He played many matches as side back from first season. However his opportunity to play decreased in 1990s. In 1995, he moved to the Japan Football League club Honda. He played many matches over three seasons and retired at the end of the 1997 season.

Coaching career
After retirement, Higashikawa started coaching career at Honda in 1998. In 2006, he moved to newly promoted J2 League club, Ehime FC. He served as coach for the top team in 2006 and manager for the youth team in 2007. In 2008, he moved to the Regional Leagues club V-Varen Nagasaki and became a manager. The club was promoted to Japan Football League in 2009. However, the club results were poor and he was fired in June 2009.

Club statistics

References

External links

Júbilo Iwata

1964 births
Living people
Kokushikan University alumni
Association football people from Ishikawa Prefecture
Japanese footballers
Japan Soccer League players
J1 League players
Japan Football League (1992–1998) players
Júbilo Iwata players
Honda FC players
Japanese football managers
V-Varen Nagasaki managers
Association football defenders